The Brumbies Women are an Australian rugby union team based in Canberra, Australian Capital Territory (ACT). The team competes in the annual Super W competition. They have competed in every edition since Rugby Australia announced that a national women's rugby competition would be launched in 2018.

History 
The Brumbies only managed one win against the Melbourne Rebels during the inaugural season of Super W in 2018.

In 2019 there was a change to the finals format with an additional playoff match added for the teams which finished second and third during the regular season. The Brumbies finished the regular season in third place and played in the playoffs against , but they were defeated 10–39.

The Brumbies completed the 2020 Super W season in third place after the playoff and final was cancelled due to the COVID-19 pandemic.

Current squad 
On 9 February 2022, the squad for the 2022 season was announced.

Season standings 
Super W
 {| class="wikitable" style="text-align:center;"
! style="width:20px;" |Year
! style="width:20px;" |Pos
! style="width:20px;" |Pld
! style="width:20px;" |W
! style="width:20px;" |D
! style="width:20px;" |L
! style="width:20px;" |F
! style="width:20px;" |A
! style="width:40px;" |+/-
! style="width:20px;" |BP
! style="width:20px;" |Pts
! text-align:left;" | Play-offs
|-
|2020
|3rd
|4
|2
|0
|2
|74
|97
|−23
|1
|9
| align="left" | Lost to Queensland in playoff
|-
|2019
|3rd
|4
|2
|0
|2
|86
|50
| +36
|1
|9
| align="left" | Lost to Queensland in playoff
|-
|2018
|4th
|4
|1
|0
|3
|57
|103
|–46
|1
|5
| align="left" | Did not compete
|}

References

External links 

 Official website

2017 establishments in Australia
Rugby clubs established in 2017
Women's rugby union teams in Australia
Super W
Rugby union teams in the Australian Capital Territory
Sporting clubs in Canberra
ACT Brumbies